is a Japanese professional footballer who plays as a midfielder for Velos Kronos Tsuno.

Career

V-Varen Nagasaki
Furube played his first game in the J. League Division 2 for V-Varen Nagasaki on 24 March 2013 against Matsumoto Yamaga in which he started and played the full 90 minutes as Nagasaki drew the match 1–1. He then scored his first goal of the season for the club on 17 April 2013 in which he scored in the 83rd minute against Yokohama FC as he led Nagasaki to a 2–1 victory.

Career statistics
Updated to end of 2018 season.

1Includes Promotion Playoffs to J1.

References

External links 
Profile at Montedio Yamagata
Profile at V-Varen Nagasaki

1985 births
Living people
Ritsumeikan University alumni
Association football people from Hyōgo Prefecture
Japanese footballers
J1 League players
J2 League players
Japan Football League players
Yokohama F. Marinos players
Zweigen Kanazawa players
V-Varen Nagasaki players
Avispa Fukuoka players
Montedio Yamagata players
Association football midfielders